Governors of the city of Worcester, England, include:

Civil War

Notes

References

Further reading
 — Mentions William son of the Earl of Pembroke as  governor at the time of Henry III
 —Lists and quotes a collection of sources that can be used to build up a short biography of Sir Henry Washington.

History of Worcester, England
Governor
Worcester